This is a list of radio stations that broadcast on FM frequency 96.4 MHz:

Australia
 Sounds of the Mountains 96.4 Tumut

Belarus
 Radio Mahilyow

Belgium
 Rtbf

Bulgaria
 Horizont (Nikipol frequency)

China (mainland) 
 CNR The Voice of China in Xi'an, Yinchuan and Qujiang

Czech Republic
 Hitradio Orion

Germany
 WDR 2 (Höxter frequency)

Greece
 Metropolis FM

Hong Kong
 RTHK Radio 2 (Castle Peak frequency)

Hungary
 96.4 ROXY Radio

Republic of Ireland
 Clare FM
 South East Radio

Kosovo
 Radio Rinia

Malaysia
 Sinar in North Perak, Padang Rengas Kuala Kangsar and Central Perak

Malta
 Energy FM

Monaco
 Fréquence JAZZ (French station)

New Zealand
 Coast (Taranaki frequency)
 Classic Hits Forestland
 Radio Southland

Russia
 X-FM

Sierra Leone
 Radio Bontico

United Kingdom
 Free Radio Birmingham (in Birmingham and the West Midlands)
 CFM Radio (Carlisle frequency)
 Greatest Hits Radio Yorkshire (in Grimsby)
 Downtown Radio (Limavady frequency)
 Greatest Hits Radio South (in Guildford frequency)
 Heart East (in Kings Lynn)
 Heart West (in Torbay and Torquay) 
 KMFM Shepway and White Cliffs Country (Shepway frequency)
 Heart North East (Hexham frequency)
 Greatest Hits Radio (Cheshire frequency)
 Tay FM (Perth frequency)
 The Wave (Kilvey Hill frequency)

References

Lists of radio stations by frequency